Aberdeen Cathedral may refer to one of three cathedrals in Aberdeen, Scotland:

St Andrew's Cathedral, Aberdeen, cathedral of Scottish Episcopal Diocese of Aberdeen and Orkney
St Machar's Cathedral, original cathedral in Old Aberdeen, now a High Kirk of the Church of Scotland in the Presbytery of Aberdeen
St Mary's Cathedral, Aberdeen, cathedral of the Roman Catholic Diocese of Aberdeen and see of the Bishop of Aberdeen